The Taipei Zoo, sometimes referred to as the "Muzha Zoo", is a public zoological garden in Wenshan District, Taipei, Taiwan. It is the most famous zoological garden in Taiwan and a leader in conservation, research and education, and recreation. It is one of the largest zoos in Asia, with a total area of 165 hectares, of which more than 90 ha are developed.

History
It was originally a private zoological garden owned by a Japanese citizen, Mr. Oe. The Japanese government in Taiwan bought the property the following year and opened it as a public park. After World War II, the Republic of China (ROC) retreated to Taiwan and the ownership of the park was passed to the Taipei City Government of ROC. An Asian elephant named Lin Wang that served with the Chinese Expeditionary Force during the Second Sino-Japanese War (1937–1945) and later relocated to Taiwan with the Kuomintang forces was moved to the zoo, and lived out most of his life and was the most popular animal at the zoo, and the most famous animal in Taiwan until it received 2 pandas from China. Many adults and children alike affectionately called the bull elephant "Grandpa Lin Wang". Due to a need for expansion and for better conditions for the animals, the zoo was moved to its current site in Muzha on the southeastern suburb of Taipei City in 1986. It is, therefore, sometimes referred to as the "Muzha Zoo" to be distinguished from the former "Yuan-shan Zoo". The current site encloses 165 hectares, including 90 hectares open to the public.

The zoo was badly hit during Typhoon Soudelor on 8 August 2015 which caused NT$10 million of loss with additional NT$4 million in reparation cost. The zoo opened again on 11 August 2015 while some parts of it were still kept closed.

The zoo was awarded the Japanese Foreign Minister’s Commendation for their contributions to promotion of mutual understanding between Japan and Taiwan on December 1, 2020.

Exhibitions

Formosan Animal Area
Located near the zoo entrance, the area features animals indigenous to Taiwan such as clouded leopards, Eurasian otters, Formosan black bears, Formosan rock macaques, Formosan sika deer, leopard cats, Taiwan serows, Taiwanese pangolins and wild boars.

Children's Zoo

Young guests can interact with domestic animals like alpacas, chickens, donkeys and pigs. The Children's Zoo also has habitats for some wild animals like meerkats, raccoons and South American coati.

Insectarium
The statue of a stag beetle stands at the entrance of the zoo's insectarium, which contains lots of species of insects and arachnids. Behind the Insectarium is a butterfly garden with more than 125 species of butterfly.

Tropical Rainforest Area
Animals from the rainforests of Southeast Asia are featured here, including Asian elephants, Asian small-clawed otters, Bengal tigers, Bornean orangutans, great hornbills, leopards, Malayan tapirs and siamangs, alongside a few animals from South America like black-capped squirrel monkeys, capybaras and giant anteaters.

Pangolin Dome

The Pangolin Dome is a pavilion which was completed in 2019 at a cost of NT$390 million. Its design was inspired by the shape of a pangolin and is intended to raise public awareness about wildlife trafficking in general and more specifically the pangolin trade. The pavilion sits on 1.5 hectares, is 24 meters tall, and comprises six outdoor exhibits and one indoor. The large dome-shaped indoor exhibit is used to display several tropical rainforest species. A female aye-aye arrived from the Ueno Zoo in 2019.

Giant Panda House 

In 2008, the zoo received two pandas from the People's Republic of China (PRC), named Tuan Tuan and Yuan Yuan (meaning "reunion"), as a gesture of unity. The gift of the endangered pandas had been rejected by President Chen Shui-bian in 2005 who viewed it as a propaganda tool against Taiwan's independence, but the next president, Ma Ying-jeou, of the Kuomintang, had forged stronger economic and diplomatic relations with the PRC under his presidency, and was willing to accept them. The offering of pandas as a gift from the PRC is often known as "panda diplomacy", and the zoo expected to draw around 30,000 visitors a day as a result of their arrival. The move was criticized by supporters of Taiwan's independence and the opposition Democratic Progressive Party, who said that "Tuan Tuan and Yuan Yuan means a union, which perfectly matches Beijing's goal of bringing Taiwan into its fold."

The offspring of Tuan Tuan and Yuan Yuan, Yuan Zai, was born on July 6, 2013. She is the first panda cub to be born in Taiwan. Yuan Zai's public debut was on January 6, 2014.

Desert Animal Area
This sub-section of the zoo contains addaxes, African wild asses and Bactrian camels.

Australian Animal Area
A pair of koalas arrived from the Currumbin Wildlife Sanctuary in 1999 and koalas have been prominently kept on display ever since. Additionally, eastern grey kangaroos, emus and southern cassowaries are also displayed here.

African Animal Zone
The exhibit simulates the East African savanna and covers 6 hectares of land for several large animals. These include African bush elephants, Chapman's zebras, common elands, giraffes, bongos, hippos, lions, olive baboons, lemurs, pygmy hippos, western lowland gorillas and white rhinos.

Bird World
More than 130 species of bird are on display, including black-faced spoonbills, cockatoos, eagles, flamingos, parrots, pelicans, pheasants, pigeons, red-crowned cranes, scarlet ibises and other waterfowl.

Amphibian and Reptile House
The Amphibian and Reptile House has a wavy ceiling, meant to resemble the movement of snakes. Over 90 species of reptiles and amphibians are housed in here, including Aldabra giant tortoises, ball pythons, eastern blue-tongued skinks, green tree pythons, Indian star tortoises, Taipei tree frogs and many more.

Temperate Zone Animal Area
Multiple temperate species are on display here, these include American bisons, brown bears, gray wolves, Przewalski's horses, pumas, red pandas and tomistoma. The zoo's penguin house is also located nearby, including two species of penguins, the African penguin and king penguin.

Transportation
  MetroTaipei Zoo station
 :BR01
 :Y01

  GondolaTaipei Zoo station
Taipei Zoo South station

The zoo is accessible from Taipei Zoo Station of the Taipei Metro.

Gallery

References

External links 

 
1914 establishments in Taiwan
Zoos established in 1914